Lura is a borough of the city of Sandnes in the west part of the large municipality of Sandnes in Rogaland county, Norway. The  borough lies in the northwestern part of the city, just north of the city centre of Sandnes and just south of the city of Stavanger.  The borough has a population (2016) of 8,605.  Lura Church is the main church for the borough. Lura school is one of the primary schools there, with grades from 1–7.

References

Boroughs and neighbourhoods of Sandnes